A parenting style is a psychological construct representing standard strategies that parents use in their child rearing. The quality of parenting can be more essential than the quantity of time spent with the child. For instance, the parent may be engaging in a different activity and not demonstrating enough interest in the child. Parenting styles are the representation of how parents respond to and make demands on their children. Parenting practices are specific behaviors, while parenting styles represent broader patterns of parenting practices. There are various theories and opinions on the best ways to rear children, as well as differing levels of time and effort that parents are willing to invest.

Children go through different stages in life, therefore parents create their own parenting styles from a combination of factors that evolve over time as children begin to develop their own personalities. During the stage of infancy, parents try to adjust to a new lifestyle in terms of adapting and bonding with their new infant. Developmental psychologists distinguish between the relationship between the child and parent, which ideally is one of attachment, and the relationship between the parent and child, referred to as bonding. In the stage of adolescence, parents encounter new challenges, such as adolescents seeking and desiring freedom.

A child's temperament and parents' cultural patterns have an influence on the kind of parenting style a child may receive. How parents were raised also influences the parenting styles they choose to use. 

Early research in parenting and child development found that parents who provide their children with proper nurture, independence and firm control, have children who appear to have higher levels of competence and are socially skilled and proficient. Showing love and nurturing children with care and affection encourages positive, physical, and mental progress in children. Additional developmental skills result from positive parenting styles including: maintaining a close relationship with others, being self-reliant, and being independent. During the mid 1980s, researchers began to explore how specific parenting styles influence a child's development later in life. Diana Baumrind's influential typology divides parenting styles into three styles, the authoritative, authoritarian and indulgent (or permissive) styles.

Distinction with parenting practices 

According to a literature review by Christopher Spera (2005), Darling and Steinberg (1993) suggest that it is important to better understand the differences between parenting styles and parenting practices: "Parenting practices are defined as specific behaviors that parents use to socialize their children", while parenting style is "the emotional climate in which parents raise their children." Others such as Lamborn and Dornbusch Darling and Steinberg assisted in the research focusing on impacts of parenting practices on adolescence achievement.

One study association that has been made is the difference between "child's outcome and continuous measures of parental behavior." Some of the associations listed include: Support, Engagement, Warmth, Recognition, Control, Monitoring, and Severe punishment. Parenting practices such as parental support, supervision and strict boundaries appear to be associated with higher school grades, fewer behavioral problems and better mental health. These components have no age limit and can start in preschool all the way through college.

Theories of child rearing 
Beginning in the 17th century, two philosophers independently wrote works that have been widely influential in child-rearing. John Locke's 1693 book Some Thoughts Concerning Education is a well-known foundation for educational pedagogy from a Puritan standpoint. Locke highlights the importance of experiences to a child's development and recommends developing their physical habits first. In 1762, the French philosopher Jean-Jacques Rousseau published a volume on education, Emile: or, On Education. He proposed that early education should be derived less from books and more from a child's interactions with the world. Among them, Rousseau is more in line with slow parenting, and Locke is more for concerted cultivation.

Jean Piaget's theory of cognitive development describes how children represent and reason about the world. This is a developmental stage theory that consists of a Sensorimotor stage, Preoperational stage, Concrete operational stage, and Formal operational stage. Piaget was a pioneer in the field of child development and psychology and continues to influence parents, educators and other theorists with a significant effect on science .

Erik Erikson, a developmental psychologist, proposed eight life stages through which each person must develop. In order to move through the eight stages, there is a crisis that must occur. Then there is a new dilemma that encourages the growth through the next stage. In each stage, they must understand and balance two conflicting forces, and so parents might choose a series of parenting styles that helps each child as appropriate at each stage. The first five of his eight stages occur in childhood: The virtue of hope requires balancing trust with mistrust, and typically occurs from birth to one year old. Will balances autonomy with shame and doubt around the ages of two to three. Purpose balances initiative with guilt around the ages of four to six years. Competence balances industry against inferiority around ages seven to 12. Fidelity contrasts identity with role confusion, in ages 13 to 19. The remaining adult virtues are love, care and wisdom.

Rudolf Dreikurs believed that pre-adolescent children's misbehavior was caused by their unfulfilled wish to be a member of a social group. He argued that they then act out a sequence of four mistaken goals: first they seek attention. If they do not get it, they aim for power, then revenge and finally feel inadequate. This theory is used in education as well as parenting, forming a valuable theory upon which to manage misbehavior. Other parenting techniques should also be used to encourage learning and happiness. He emphasized the significance to establish a democratic family style that adopts a method of periodic democratic family councils while averting punishment. He advances “logical and natural consequences” that teach children to be responsible and understand the natural consequences of proper rules of conduct and improper behavior.

Frank Furedi is a sociologist with a particular interest in parenting and families. He believes that the actions of parents are less decisive than others claim. He describes the term infant determinism as the determination of a person's life prospects by what happens to them during infancy, arguing that there is little or no evidence for its truth. While commercial, governmental and other interests constantly try to guide parents to do more and worry more for their children, he believes that children are capable of developing well in almost any circumstances. Furedi quotes Steve Petersen of Washington University in St. Louis: "development really wants to happen. A very poor environment is needed to interfere with development... [just] do not raise your child in a closet, starve them, or hit them on the head with a frying pan". Similarly, the journalist Tim Gill has expressed concern about excessive risk aversion by parents and those responsible for children in his book No Fear. This aversion limits the opportunities for children to develop sufficient adult skills, particularly in dealing with risk, but also in performing adventurous and imaginative activities.

In 1998, independent scholar Judith Rich Harris published The Nurture Assumption, in which she argued that scientific evidence, especially behavioral genetics, showed that all different forms of parenting do not have significant effects on children's development, short of cases of severe child abuse or child neglect. She proposes two main points for the effects: genetic effects, and social effects involved by the peer groups in which children participate. The purported effects of different forms of parenting are all illusions caused by heredity, the culture at large, and children's own influence on how their parents treat them.

Baumrind's parenting typology 
Diana Baumrind is a researcher who focused on the classification of parenting styles into what is now known as Baumrind’s parenting typology. In her research, she found what she considered to be the four basic elements that could help shape successful parenting: responsiveness vs. unresponsiveness and demanding vs. undemanding. Parental responsiveness refers to the degree to which the parent responds to the child's needs in a supportive and accepting manner. Parental Demandingness refers to the rules which the parent has in place for their child's behavior, the expectations for their children to comply with these rules, and the level of repercussions that follow if those rules are broken. Through her studies Baumrind identified three initial parenting styles: Authoritative parenting, authoritarian parenting and permissive parenting. Maccoby and Martin expanded upon Baumrind’s three original parenting styles by placing parenting styles into two distinct categories: demanding and undemanding. With these distinctions, four new parenting styles were defined:

Baumrind believes that parents should be neither punishing nor apathetic.  Instead, they should make rules for their children and be affectionate with them. These parenting styles are designed to describe normal changes in parenting, rather than abnormal parenting, such as might be observed in abusive families. In addition, parenting stress can often cause changes in parental behavior such as inconsistency, increased negative communication, decreased monitoring and/or supervision, 
setting vague rules or limits on behavior, being more reactive and less proactive, and engaging in increasingly harsh disciplinary behaviors.

Chandler, Heffer, and Turner argue that parenting styles are associated with adolescent psychological and behavioral problems and may affect academic performance.

The four styles 
The four styles include Authoritative, Authoritarian, Neglectful, and Indulgent/Permissive. Each style has been explained based on the definition and is elaborated considering demandingness and responsiveness.

Authoritative 

The parent is demanding and responsive.  When this style is systematically developed, it grows to fit the descriptions propagative parenting, democratic parenting, positive parenting and concerted cultivation.

Authoritative parenting is characterized by a child-centered approach that holds high expectations of maturity. Authoritative parents can understand how their children are feeling and teach them how to regulate their feelings. Even with high expectations of maturity, authoritative parents are usually forgiving of any possible shortcomings. They often help their children to find appropriate outlets to solve problems. Authoritative parents encourage children to be independent but still place limits on their actions. Extensive verbal give-and-take is not refused, and parents try to be warm and nurturing toward the child. Authoritative parents are not usually as controlling as authoritarian parents, allowing the child to explore more freely, thus having them make their own decisions based upon their own reasoning. Often, authoritative parents produce children who are more independent and self-reliant. Authoritative parenting styles are mainly produced in the context of high parental responses and high demands.

Authoritative parents will set clear standards for their children, monitor the limits that they set, and also allow children to develop autonomy. They also expect mature, independent, and age-appropriate behavior of children. Punishments for misbehavior are measured and consistent, not arbitrary or violent. Often behaviors are not punished but the natural consequences of the child's actions are explored and discussed—allowing the child to see that the behavior is inappropriate and not to be repeated, rather than not repeated to merely avoid adverse consequences. Authoritative parents set limits and demand maturity, and when punishing a child, authoritative parents are more likely to explain their reason  for punishment. In some cases, this may lead to more understanding and complying behavior from the child. A child knows why they are being punished because an authoritative parent makes the reasons known. As a result, children of authoritative parents are more likely to be successful, well-liked by those around them, generous and capable of self-determination.

Authoritarian 

The parent is demanding but not responsive.

Authoritarian parenting is a restrictive, punishment-heavy parenting style in which parents make their children follow their directions with little to no explanation or feedback and focus on the child's and family's perception and status. Corporal punishment, such as spanking, and yelling are a form of discipline often preferred by authoritarian parents.  The goal of this style, at least when well-intentioned, is to teach the child to behave, survive, and thrive as an adult in a harsh and unforgiving society by preparing the child for negative responses such as anger and aggression that the child will face if their behavior is inappropriate. In addition, advocates of the authoritarian style often believe that the shock of aggression from someone from the outside world will affect children less because they are accustomed to both acute and chronic stress imposed by parents.

Authoritarian parenting has distinctive effects on children:
 Children raised using this type of parenting may have less social competence because the parent generally tells the child what to do instead of allowing the child to choose by themself, making the child appear to excel in the short term but limiting development in ways that are increasingly revealed as supervision and opportunities for direct parental control decline.
 Children raised by authoritarian parents tend to be conformist, highly obedient, quiet, and not very happy. These children often experience depression and self-blame.
 For some children raised by authoritarian parents, these behaviors continue into adulthood.
 Children who are resentful of or angry about being raised in an authoritarian environment but have managed to develop high behavioral self-confidence often rebel in adolescence and/or young adulthood.
 Children who experience anger and resentment coupled with the downsides of both inhibited self-efficacy and high self-blame often retreat into escapist behaviors, including but not limited to substance abuse, and are at heightened risk for suicide.
 Specific aspects of authoritarian styles prevalent among certain cultures and ethnic groups, most notably aspects of traditional Asian child-rearing practices sometimes described as authoritarian, often continued by Asian American families and sometimes emulated by intensive parents from other cultures, may be associated with more positive median child outcomes than Baumrind's model predicts, albeit at the risk of exacerbated downside outcomes exemplified by Asian cultural phenomena such as hikikomori and the heightened suicide rates found in South Korea, in India and by international observers of China before 2014.
Many Non-Western parents tend to have more of an Authoritarian parenting style rather than Authoritative because adult figures are generally more highly respected in other countries. Children are expected to comply with their parents rules without question. This is a common critique of Baumrind’s Three Parenting Styles because Authoritarian parenting is generally associated with negative outcomes, however, many other cultures are considered to use an Authoritarian parenting style, and it is considered in those cultures not to negatively affect the child.

Indulgent or permissive 
The parent is responsive but not demanding.

Indulgent parenting, also called permissive, non-directive, lenient, libertarian, or (by supporters) anti-authoritarian, is characterized as having few behavioral expectations for the child. "Indulgent parenting is a style of parenting in which parents are very involved with their children but place few demands or controls on them". Parents are nurturing and accepting, and are responsive to the child's needs and wishes. Indulgent parents do not require children to regulate themselves or behave appropriately.  As adults, children of indulgent parents will pay less attention to avoiding behaviors that cause aggression in others.

Permissive parents try to be "friends" with their child, and do not play a parental role. The expectations of the child are very low, and there is little discipline. Permissive parents also allow children to make their own decisions, giving them advice as a friend. This type of parenting is very lax, with few punishments or rules. Permissive parents also tend to give their children whatever they want and hope that they are appreciated for their accommodating style. Other permissive parents compensate for what they missed as children, and as a result give their children both the freedom and materials that they lacked in their childhood. Baumrind's research on pre-school children with permissive parents found that the children were immature, lacked impulse control and were irresponsible.

Children of permissive parents may tend to be more impulsive and as adolescents may engage more in misconduct such as drug use, "Children never learn to control their own behavior and always expect to get their way." But in the better cases they are emotionally secure, independent and are willing to learn and accept defeat. They mature quickly and are able to live life without the help of someone else.

From a 2014 study,
 The teens least prone to heavy drinking had parents who scored high on both accountability and warmth.
 So-called 'indulgent' parents, those low on accountability and high on warmth, nearly tripled the risk of their teen participating in heavy drinking.
 'Strict parents' or authoritarian parents – high on accountability and low on warmth – more than doubled their teen’s risk of heavy drinking.

Neglectful or uninvolved 
The parent is not responsive and not demanding.

Neglectful parents don’t respond to their child’s needs or desires beyond the basics of food, clothing, and shelter. Unlike the indulgent/permissive parents, neglectful parents do this because they are detached from their children's needs. Neglectful parents are unaware of what their kids are doing, and if they find out, they feel indifferent towards them. Sometimes parents can be neglectful because of stressors they are experiencing in their own life.

Children of neglectful parents are often lonely, sad, immature, and have a difficult time to adapting to social norms. They are more likely to end up in abusive relationships, perform risky behaviors, and have increased rates of injury. They can also struggle with low self-esteem and emotional neediness.

Cultural effects on children 
Most studies, mainly in English-speaking countries, show that children of authoritative parents have the best outcomes in different domains (behavioral, psychological and social adjustment…). The case might be different, however, for Asian populations, where the authoritarian style was found as good as the authoritative style. On the other hand, some studies have found a superiority of the indulgent style in Spain, Portugal or Brazil, but the methodology of these studies has been contested. More recently a study has shown that in Spain, while using the same questionnaire used in other countries, the authoritative style continues to be the best one for children. Furthermore, a systematic review has shown that the results do not depend on the culture but on the instruments used: studies measuring control as coercion find a detrimental effect of such control on adolescents, and better outcomes for children of permissive parents; however, when behavioral control is measured, such control is positive, and authoritative parents get the best results.

Attachment theory 

Attachment theory was created by John Bowlby and Mary Ainsworth. This theory focuses on the attachment of parents and children (specifically through infancy), and the aspect of children staying in close distance with their caregiver who will protect them from the outside world.

This theory includes the possible types of attachment:

 Secure attachment is when the child feels comfortable exploring their environment when their caregiver is not there, but uses them as a base for comfort and security if they become frightened.
 Insecure attachment is when the child is hesitant to explore the environment on their own, and display reluctance in accepting comfort from their parent.

Attachment theory in adolescence 
Although research on attachment theory has focused on infancy and early childhood, research has shown that the relationship between teens and their parents can be affected depending on whether they have a secure or insecure attachment between them. A parent's interaction with their child during infancy creates an internal working model of attachment, which is the development of expectations that a child has for future relationships and interactions based on the interactions they had during infancy with their caregiver. If an adolescent continues to have a secure attachment with their caregiver, they are more likely to talk to their guardian about their problems and concerns, have stronger interpersonal relationships with friends and significant others, and also have higher self-esteem. Parents continue to maintain a secure attachment through adolescence by expressing understanding, good communication skills, and allowing their children to safely start doing things independently.

Other parenting styles

Attachment parenting 
Attachment parenting is a parenting style framed by psychological attachment theory. Attachment in psychology is defined as “a lasting emotional bond between people”. There are four main types of attachment: secure, insecure, resistant, and disorganized.
 Resistant attachment relationships are typically going to be characterized by the child's exaggerated expression of getting their needs met through attachment. When the infant is in with their caregiver, they begin to act hesitant towards exploring their environment and care more about getting attention from the caregiver.
 Disorganized is when the child outwardly shows behaviors that are odd or ambivalent towards the parent, (i.e. when the child runs up to their parent, and then immediately pulls away, and turns around to run away, curling up in a ball, or even hitting the parent.)

Child-centered parenting 
Child-centered parenting is a parenting style advocated by Blythe and David Daniel, which focuses on the real needs and the unique person-hood of each child. Research has shown that child-centered parenting is difficult to get right and has a high chance of failing, resulting in narcissistic children.

Positive parenting 
Positive parenting is a parenting style which generally overlaps with authoritative parenting and is defined by consistent support and guidance throughout developmental stages.
Concerted Cultivation is a specific form of positive parenting characterized by parents' attempts to foster their child's talents through organized extracurricular activities such as music lessons, sports/athletics, and academic enrichment.

Narcissistic parenting 
A narcissistic parent is a parent affected by narcissism or narcissistic personality disorder. Typically narcissistic parents are exclusively and possessively close to their children and may be especially envious of, and threatened by, their child's growing independence.  The result may be what has been termed a pattern of narcissistic attachment, with the child considered to exist solely for the parent's benefit.
Parents who are narcissistic in their parenting will be involved in some if not all of these traits:

 self-importance 
 no respect for boundaries
 communication as warfare
 gaslighting
 playing the victim
 abusive behavior/ neglect

Nurturant parenting 
Nurturant parent modelNurturant parents are defined by characteristics of being responsive and empathetic. It is a family model where children are expected to explore their surroundings with protection from their parents. This style of parenting is encouraging and helps offer development opportunities for a child and their temperaments. A child's self-image, social skills, and academic performance will improve which impacts how they will grow up to be mature, happy, well-balanced adults.

Overparenting 
Overparenting is parents who try to involve themselves in every aspect of their child's life, often attempting to solve all their problems and stifling the child's ability to act independently or solve his or her own problems.  A helicopter parent is a colloquial early 21st-century term for a parent who pays extremely close attention to his or her children's experiences and problems and attempts to sweep all obstacles out of their paths, particularly at educational institutions. Over parenting limits a child's autonomy and essential development for independence. Helicopter parents are so named because they hover overhead like a helicopter, especially from late adolescence to early adulthood, during which time developing independence and self-sufficiency is critical to future success. Modern communication technology has facilitated this style, allowing parents to monitor their children through cell phones, email and online monitoring of academic performance.

Affectionless control 
The affectionless control parental style combines a lack of warmth and caring (low parental care) with over-control (such as parental criticism, intrusiveness). This has been linked to children's anxiety and to dysfunctional attitudes and low self-esteem in the children, although it is not necessarily the cause. There is evidence that parental affectionless control is associated with suicidal behavior.

Slow parenting 
Slow parenting encourages parents to plan and organize less for their children, instead allowing them to enjoy their childhood and explore the world at their own pace. Electronics are limited, simplistic toys are utilized, and the child is allowed to develop their own interests and to grow into their own person with much family time, allowing children to make their own decisions.

Idle parenting is a specific form of slow parenting according to which children can take care of themselves most of the time, and that the parents would be happier if they spent more time taking care of themselves, too.

Toxic parenting 
Toxic parenting is poor parenting, with a toxic relationship between the parent and child. It results in complete disruption of the child's ability to identify themselves and reduced self-esteem, neglecting the needs of the child. Abuse is sometimes seen in this parenting style. Adults who had toxic parents are mostly unable to recognize toxic parenting behavior in themselves. Children with toxic and/or abusive parents often grow up with psychological and behavioral damages. Some of the behaviors of toxic parenting include talking over their child, being in a cycle of negative thinking, being overly critical towards their children, and using guilt to control their child.

Pathogenic parenting 
Pathogenic parenting refers to parenting style practices that are so aberrant and distorted that they produce significant psychopathology in the child. This may lead to child psychological abuse (DSM-5 V995.51). It is generally used in the context of distortions to the child's attachment system, since the attachment system does not spontaneously or independently dysfunction.

Dolphin parenting 
Dolphin parenting is a term used by psychiatrist Shimi Kang and happiness researcher Shawn Achor to represent a parenting style seen as similar to the nature of dolphins, being "playful, social and intelligent". It has been contrasted to "tiger" parenting. According to Kang, dolphin parenting provides a balance between the strict approach of tiger parenting and the lack of rules and expectations that characterizes what she calls "jellyfish parents". Dolphin parents avoid overscheduling activities for their children, refrain from being overprotective, and take into account the desires and goals of their children when setting expectations for behavior and academic success.

'Ethnic minority' parenting style 
'Ethnic Minority' parenting style is an ethnocentric term coined in the USA out of Authoritarian parenting, and it refers to a style characterized by exceptionally high academic achievements among children from Asian backgrounds. Ethnic Minority style differs from strict authoritarian parenting by being highly responsive towards children’s needs, while also differing from authoritative parenting by maintaining high demands, and not placing children’s needs as a priority. This style promotes high demandingness and high responsiveness together to produce high academic performance in children.

Alloparenting parenting style 
Alloparenting is the practice of co-parenting a child by biological parents and members of the extended family or community. This type of parenting is most prevalent in Central African countries, such as the Democratic Republic of Congo and the Central African Republic; especially in Akka foraging communities. Alloparenting is considered to help alleviate parental burdens by utilizing the community and allowing biological parents more time to work or participate in social events. Some historians, such as Stephanie Coontz, suggest that alloparenting as a parenting style helps children to understand love and trust through a widened perspective due to increased bonds formed between child and adult.

Unconditional parenting 
The unconditional parenting style is one where parents provide their children with love and support no matter what the situation. This type of parenting does not involve rewards or punishments but instead focuses on building a strong relationship with your child. It can be beneficial as it provides a sense of security for children.

Commando Parenting is another style where parents essentially do whatever it takes to raise children in their desired way.

Cross-cultural variation 
Many of these theories of parenting styles are almost entirely based on evidence from high income countries, especially the USA. However, there are many fundamental differences in child development between high and low income countries, due to differences in parenting styles and practices. For instance, in sub-Saharan Africa children are likely to have more than one main caregiver, to acquire language in a bilingual environment, and to play in mixed aged peer groups.  However, when comparing African American caregiving among lower, middle, and upper socioeconomic families, the number of non-parental caregivers decreases as economic resources increase. In addition, international studies have found Chinese parents to be more concerned with impulse control, which may explain the greater use of authoritarian style as compared to U.S. parents. Thus, social values and norms within a culture influence the choice of parenting style that will help the child conform to cultural expectations.

There is evidence to suggest cultural differences in the way children respond to parenting practices.  In particular, there is ongoing debate surrounding physical discipline and corporal punishment of children. with some authors suggesting it is less harmful in ethnic groups or countries where it is culturally normative, such as several low income countries, where the prevalence rate remains high. Lansford et al (2004) reported harsh parenting was associated with more externalising behaviours in European American compared with African American adolescents.  Resolving these issues is important in assessing the transferability of parenting interventions across cultures and from high to low income countries in order to improve child development and health outcomes.

Some parenting styles correlate with positive outcomes across cultures, while other parenting styles correlate with outcomes that are specific to one culture. For example, authoritative parenting is related to positive self-esteem and academic outcomes for both Chinese and European American adolescents, but the positive effects of the “ethnic minority” parenting style are specific to Chinese adolescents. There is also evidence to suggest that there is not only cultural variation, but variations across settings within a culture. For example, Mexican American and African American parental expectations of obedience and autonomy differ in school and other social settings vs. home. A study comparing Indian parents who stayed in India and Indian parents who immigrated to a different country shows that the influence cultural traditions have on parenting changes according to social/geographical context, concluding that immigrant parents place greater emphasis on traditional Indian culture in order to preserve traditional practices in their new country. Thus, in immigrant families, parenting styles according to culture may be the result of conscious reinforcement as opposed to unconscious tradition.

Differences for male and female children 
Parents tend to adopt different parenting behaviors based on the sex of their child. Studies have shown that fathers can affect their daughters' emotional adjustment more through the style of parenting they demonstrate rather than through using disciplinary approaches, such as punishment. Fathers and mothers sometimes both tend to use the authoritative style with their daughters and feel more comfortable switching to the authoritarian style with their sons.

Similarly, mothers may use a more authoritative style when they parent their daughters. Mothers may spend more time reasoning with their daughters while still tending to favor their sons.

Differential parenting 
Differential parenting is when siblings individually receive different parenting styles or behavior from their parents. This most often occurs in families where the children are adolescents, and is highly related as to how each child interprets their parents behavior. Research shows that children who view their parents as authoritative generally tend to be happier and functioning at a higher level in a variety of areas. When analyzing the level of differentiation within a family, it is important to look at the difference in the level of responsiveness (including specific characteristics of warmth, sensitivity, and positivity), control, leniency, and negativity that are directed at each individual child. Differential parenting often leads to a non-shared environment, which is when siblings have different experiences growing up in the same household, and different personal outcomes based on their environment.

In most families with more than one child, parents will adjust their parenting styles according to what their child best responds to, however, a high level of differential parenting can have negative effects on children. The effects that differential parenting has on families differs, but in general there are usually negative effects on both children. The severity of effects are more extreme for the child who is viewed as disfavored. The "disfavored" child generally has a variety of personal development issues such as low self-esteem and depression. The favored child tends to have higher self-esteem and more friends in school. However, studies show that both the favored and disfavored child tend to have problems with interpersonal relationships, as well as problems with managing their emotions. A high level of differential parenting also influences how siblings treat one another, and the level of conflict in the sibling relationship. Research shows that this is due in part to children imitating their parents' behaviors.

See also 
 Dysfunctional family
 Neglect
 Resources for Infant Education (RIE)
 Hong Kong children
 Battle Hymn of the Tiger Mother
 Reflective Parenting

Citations

References 
*Hong, J. S., Kim, D. H., deLara, E. W., Wei, H.-S., Prisner, A., & Alexander, N. B. (2021). Parenting style and bullying and victimization: Comparing foreign-born Asian, US-born Asian, and White American adolescents. Journal of Family Violence, 36(7), 799–811. https://doi-org.proxy048.nclive.org/10.1007/s10896-020-00176-y
*Fatima, S., Dawood, S., & Munir, M. (2022). Parenting styles, moral identity and prosocial behaviors in adolescents. Current Psychology: A Journal for Diverse Perspectives on Diverse Psychological Issues, 41(2), 902–910. https://doi-org.proxy048.nclive.org/10.1007/s12144-020-00609-3

 Sanvictores T, Mendez MD. Types of Parenting Styles and Effects On Children. [Updated 2021 Mar 6]. In: StatPearls [Internet]. Treasure Island (FL): StatPearls Publishing; 2022 Jan-. Available from: https://www.ncbi.nlm.nih.gov/books/NBK568743/

Further reading 

 
 Robert Feldman, PhD at the University of Massachusetts Amherst. Child Development Third Edition
 Morris, A. S., Cui, L., & Steinberg, L. (2013). Parenting research and themes: What we have learned and where to go next. In R. E. Larzelere, A. S. Morris, & A. W. Harrist (Eds.), Authoritative parenting: Synthesizing nurturance and discipline for optimal child development (pp. 35–58). Washington, DC: American Psychological Association.
 Harris. Judith R.. "The Nurture Assumption: Why Children Turn Out the Way They Do," New York Times 1998.
 Warash, Bobbie. "Are Middle Class Parents Authoritative with a Touch of Permissiveness?." Delta Kappa Gamma Bulletin 74. 22007 28-31.
 Chua, Amy. Why Chinese Mothers Are Superior The Wall Street Journal
 
 Grobman, K.H. (2003).  Diana Baumrind's (1966) Prototypical Descriptions of 3 Parenting Styles. Retrieved from http://www.devpsy.org/teaching/parent/baumrind_styles.html
 
 
 
 
 
 "Attachment Parenting: Q&A with Lysa Parker, co-chairman of Attachment Parenting International." Bundoo.com. Retrieved from http://www.bundoo.com/interviews/attachment-parenting/

Childhood
Parenting